Saint Frances Cabrini Catholic Academy was a small Catholic elementary and middle school in the neighborhood of Bushwick in Brooklyn, New York. The grades went from pre-K to eighth grade, and the school was associated with the National Catholic Educational Association (NCEA). The school closed June 2019, and it merged with “Saint Brigid Catholic Academy”, also in Brooklyn, to become “St. Brigid-St. Frances Cabrini Catholic Academy.”

History 

In 1919, Reverend Monsignor Ottavio Silvestre bought the land where the parish and school building stands. In 1921, Monsignor Silvestre started to build the church, “St. Joseph Patron of the Universal Church”, and then the school. By September of that same year, students started to attend the school, and the school was originally named after the parish. Construction of the parish and the school was completed in 1922. Silvestre had originally came from Italy and stayed in the parish and school for 50 years. Many of the items inside the church were brought over from Italy. The neighborhood around the school and church was Italian, but neighboring areas were mostly German.

The school was very active for the following years. Six hundred students were enrolled, there were two classes for each grade, so classes were given both in the morning and afternoon to deal with the increased number of students. In 1975, the Diocese of Brooklyn faced a problem with many of its schools, which was declining enrollment. In response, the diocese decided to merge schools and create clusters. St. Barbara's School and St. Leonard's School were two neighboring schools that were merged with the school, their students were brought over to St. Joseph and the school was renamed “St. Frances Cabrini School” after Saint Frances Xavier Cabrini, patron saint of immigrants. The renaming was fitting because Cabrini was born in Italy and became the first American citizen to be canonized by the Roman Catholic Church. In its final years, the school continued to thrive despite the changes in demographics, serving a mostly Hispanic/Latino population, and the school's name eventually became “St. Frances Cabrini Catholic Academy.”

The school was officially closed June 2019 by the Roman Catholic Diocese of Brooklyn due to changes in the demographics of the neighborhood leading to a decline in enrollment, and deferred building maintenance. However, the school was merged with the nearby Saint Brigid Catholic Academy (438 Grove Street, Brooklyn, New York, 11237) to become “St. Brigid-St. Frances Cabrini Catholic Academy.”St. Brigid - St. Frances Cabrini Catholic Academy - Bushwick, Brooklyn The 438 Grove St building was renovated and inaugurated a STEM lab in the fall of 2019.

Students 

The student body was around 90 percent Hispanic, and the remaining student body consisted of African American, Asian, or Caucasian students. The teacher to student ratio was approximately 1:27.

The seventh and eighth graders monitored students of lower grades as part of St. Frances Cabrini's buddy system. They were “buddied” with pre-K to the sixth grade students, helping teachers out at breakfast, lunch, and recess. With this program, students gained a sense of responsibility and leadership.

An after-school program was offered to help working parents. Other extra-curricular activities included:  Yearbook Committee, Mary's Club, Altar Servers, Music, and Choir.

References

External links
Official website

Catholic elementary schools in New York City
Private elementary schools in Brooklyn
Private middle schools in Brooklyn